Kattukurangu is a 1969 Indian Malayalam-language film, directed by P. Bhaskaran and written by K. Surendran. The film stars Sathyan, Sharada, Jayabharathi and Kaviyoor Ponnamma. It was released on 6 February 1969.

Cast 

Sathyan as Prabhakaran
Sharada as Minikutty
Jayabharathi as Ambili
Kaviyoor Ponnamma as Thulasi
Adoor Bhasi
Jose Prakash as Das
Kottayam Santha
Pappukutty Bhagavathar
Pattom Sadan
P. J. Antony as Vasavan
Baby Rajani
Baby Rani
K. P. Ummer as Chakrapani
Khadeeja
Meena as Kamalam
N. Govindankutty
Vanchiyoor Radha

Soundtrack

References

External links 
 

1969 films
1960s Malayalam-language films
Films directed by P. Bhaskaran